Tornow group, also known as Tornow-Klenica and Tornow-Gostyn in Poland, in archaeology refers to the Middle Slavic pottery and related strongholds of "Tornow-type" which were present in the middle of Obra, Oder, Spree but also Elbe and Saale basins from Greater Poland up to Thuringia. It is a derivation of Prague-Korchak (and possibly Sukow-Dziedzice culture in Northeastern part).

Tornow-type pottery 
It is generally named after Lower Lusatian village Tornow (district of Oberspreewald-Lausitz, Brandenburg), which doesn't exist anymore since mid-20th century and where were held extensive archaeological excavations in the 1960s. Unfortunately, the early results have been politically used by Joachim Herrmann to make unsubstantiated claims about the migrations of the Early Slavs to East Germany and their level of cultural and societal complexity in comparison to Germanic peoples. Since 1980s the data was critically evaluated and old model rejected - they are not from 7th century early-Slavic but later middle-Slavic period with Carolingian influence. According to new chronologies, radiocarbon and dendrochonological dates, it appeared at least since the second half of the 9th century until late 10th century. M. Dulinicz also excluded it from Early Slavic pottery but wrongly dated it only since the end of 9th century. Barford considered since the first half of the 9th century with possible 8th century prototypes. Brzostowicz in 2002 since the late 8th century. Based on collected data, Lozny in 2013 dated it since late 8th or early 9th century. A minority of finds survived until the early 11th century.

It is the most know type of pottery with ripped decoration called Rippenschulterware. It had highest concentration in Brandenburg, but it was present from Greater Poland up to Elbe-Saale valley. As the valley mainly was an area of Leipzig group, Tornow-type was widespread on a much larger area than the supposedly related Sorbian-Lusatian tribes of Milzeni & Lusici, Dadosesani among others, thus rejecting simplified theses about links between individual tribes and material cultures. Individual finds were also found in West Pommerania, Central Poland, and Podlachia in Eastern Poland. In some occasions, Feldberg and Menkendorf group pottery were also found in Tornow-type strongholds. Tornow pottery was technologically more advanced from both Feldberg and Menkendorf group, almost resembling Late Slavic tradition. It shares some features with Bohemian-Moravian pottery. Ceramological studies in 2011 and 2012 as well as archaeometric study in 2020 of Tornow-type pottery samples found "no differences in technology of this type of pottery, either in that found in the territory of Western Poland or that found in the territory of Eastern Germany", suggesting both territories were culturally related.

Tornow-type forts 
The appearance of Tornow-type forts some date to late 9th and early 10th century, while others "in the late 700s/early 800s and existed until late 800/early 900s". Their highest concentration was in Brandenburg, Schleswig-Holstein, Wendland, also in Pomerania and Greater Poland, but not Mecklenburg. The reason for their building could be several. It is argued to have been seats of local tribal chiefs, and possibly indicate a turbulent period of events when on the territory of Lusatian lands clashed German, Moravian-Bohemian, and Polish military forces in the 10th century. According to Ludomir R. Lozny, the dynamic Slavic social and political events and the Carolingian Empire expansion in North Central European Plains (NCEP) possibly resulted with the wide "Tornow Interaction Sphere" (TIS) of specific forts, villages and mixture of pottery types, but not a "state-level polity". The military construction of forts and found weaponry could also indicate a need of a "buffer zone between the Empire and the Norsemen". TIS fall was soon followed by unification process in Greater Poland leading to the formation of the Duchy of Poland (c. 960–1025).

Notes

References 
 Fernando Agua, María-Ángeles Villegas, Urszula Kobylińska, Zbigniew Kobyliński and Manuel García-Heras (2020). "Archaeometric study of Medieval Tornow-type pottery from archaeological sites in Western Poland and EasternGermany". Archaeologica Hereditas. Vol 17, pp. 71–84
 Paul M. Barford (2001). The Early Slavs: Culture and Society in Early Medieval Eastern Europe. Cornell University Press. ISBN 9780801439773
 Sebastian Brather (2004). "The beginnings of Slavic settlement east of the river Elbe". Antiquity, Volume 78, Issue 300. pp. 314–329
 Sebastian Brather (2001; 2nd ed. 2008). Archäologie der westlichen Slawen: Siedlung, Wirtschaft und Gesellschaft im früh- und hochmittelalterlichen Ostmitteleuropa. Walter de Gruyter. ISBN 9783110206098
 Felix Biermann (2009). "M. Dulinicz, Frühe Slawen im Gebiet zwischen unterer Weichsel und Elbe. Studien zur Siedlungsgeschichte und Archäologie der Ostseegebiete (Neumünster 2006)". Germania (87). pp. 331-334.
 Felix Biermann (2011). "Functions of the Large Feldberg Type Strongholds from the 8th/9th Century in Mecklenburg and Pomerania". Sprawozdania Archeologiczne (63), pp. 149–173
 Eike Gringmuth-Dallmer (2017). "Between Science and Ideology: Aspects of Archaeological Research in the Former GDR Between the End of World War II and the Reunification", pp. 235–273. In Archaeology of the Communist Era: A Political History of Archaeology of the 20th Century, ed. Ludomir R. Lozny. Springer. ISBN 978-3-319-45106-0 
 Marek Dulinicz (1994). "Problem datowania grodzisk typu Tornow i grupy Tornow-Klenica". Archeologia Polski. Vol 39 (1-2), pp. 31–49
 
 Bartłomiej Gruszka, Piotr Gunia, Michał Kara (2017). "Workshop pottery from the early phases of the early Middle Ages in the Middle Odra basin in the light of specialist analyses". Archaeologia Polona. Vol 55, pp. 39–76
 Joachim Henning (1998). "Neues zum Tornower Typ: Keramische Formen und Formenspektren des Frühmittelalters im Licht dendrochronologischer Daten zum westslawischen Siedlungsraum". Slavonic countries in the Middle Ages. Profanum and sacrum. Poznań, pp. 392–408, ISBN 9788370632038
 Zofia Kurnatowska (2008). "Nowe spojrzenie na geneze ceramiki wczesnosredniowiecznej". Archeologia Polski. Vol 53 (1), pp. 73–80
 Ludomir R. Lozny (2013). Prestate Societies of the North Central European Plains: 600-900 CE. Springer. ISBN 9781461468158
 Sławomir Moździoch (2016). "From a Tribe to a State: The Archaeology of the Early Middle Ages in the Interior Area Between the Odra and Bug Rivers—the So-Called ‘Tribal Period’". In: Trzeciecki, M., ed. The Past Societies. Polish Lands from the First Evidence of Human Presence to the Early Middle Ages: 500 ad–1000 AD, Vol 5. Warsaw: Institute of Archaeology and Ethnology, Polish Academy of Sciences, pp. 123–167, ISBN 9788363760779
 Mats Roslund (2007). Guests in the House: Cultural Transmission between Slavs and Scandinavians 900 to 1300 AD. BRILL. ISBN 9789047421856

External links 
 Tornow Pottery

Slavic archaeological cultures
Archaeological cultures in Germany
Archaeological cultures in Poland